Berber Americans, American Berbers or Amazigh Americans, are Americans of Berber (or Amazigh) descent. Although a part of the population of the Maghreb (in the North Africa) is of Berber descent, only 1,327 people declared Berber ancestry in the 2000 US Census. People of Berber origin in United States have created several associations with goal of maintaining and strengthening their language and culture, such as the Amazigh Cultural Association in America (ACAA), The United Amazigh Algerian (UAAA), The Amazigh American Association of Washington, DC., and the Boston Amazigh Community.

Notable people
Zehlia Babaci-Wilhite, Algerian-descent researcher and linguistics scholar, University of California, Berkeley
Elias Zerhouni, Algerian-born radiologist and medical researcher
Helene Hagan, American anthropologist and Amazigh activist
Mohamed Mrabet, Moroccan-born author artist and storyteller of the Ait Ouriaghel tribe in the Rif region
Zaida Ben-Yusuf, English-born Algerian-American  portrait photographer.
Malika Zarra, Moroccan-born, American/Moroccan singer, composer, and music producer now based in New York City
Othmane Benafan, NASA scientist and co-inventor

See also
North Africans in the United States
Arab Americans
Algerian Americans
Moroccan Americans
Tunisian Americans
Libyan Americans
Egyptian Americans
Malian Americans
Canarian Americans

References

 
 
North Africans in the United States
Multiracial ethnic groups in the United States